Matam (Wolof: Mataam) is the capital town of the Matam Region in north-east Senegal, and lies on the Sénégal River on the border with Mauritania. In the census of 2002, Matam had 14,620 inhabitants. In 2007, according to official estimates, the population of the town had increased to 17,324.

In 1996, the Upper Senegal River Valley, stretching from Matam to Diamou in Mali was cited as one of the poorest and most inaccessible regions in the western Sahel.

Mining 
Matam has phosphate mines in the vicinity.

Climate
Matam has a hot desert climate (BWh) with little to no rainfall in all months except July, August and September.

Notable people
 
 
Samba Diouldé Thiam

References

Populated places in Matam Region
Matam Region
Regional capitals in Senegal
Senegal River
Communes of Senegal